Calle Krantz (born 8 April 1997) is a Swedish ice hockey player. He is currently playing with Linköpings HC of the Swedish Hockey League (SHL).

Career
Born in Skellefteå, Sweden, Krantz played junior hockey with local team Skellefteå AIK in 2011–12; before joining Linköpings HC at the age of 15. In 2012, Krantz competed with a regional all-star team from Västerbotten in the annual TV-pucken, an under-15 national tournament, and recorded one assists over eight games. The following season he dressed for 13 U-18 games playing for Linköpings HC. In 2013, Krantz once again participated in the TV-pucken, playing for Västerbotten. In 2014–15, Krantz logged his first minutes for Linköpings HC's J20 SuperElit team at 17 years old, appearing in 44 games. After impressive performances in the youth ranks, Krantz played 7 games in Sweden's top-flight SHL.

Career statistics

Regular season and playoffs

References

External links

1997 births
Living people
Swedish ice hockey defencemen
People from Skellefteå Municipality
Linköping HC players
Sportspeople from Västerbotten County